Thallium(I) sulfide, Tl2S, is a chemical compound of thallium and sulfur.
It was used in some of the earliest photo-electric detectors by Theodore Case who developed the so-called thalofide (sometimes spelt thallofide) cell, used in early film projectors.  Case described the detector material as consisting of thallium, oxygen and sulfur, and this was incorrectly described by others as being thallium oxysulfide, which incidentally is a compound that is not known.  Case's work was then built on by R.J. Cashman who recognised that the controlled oxidation of the Tl2S film was key to the operation of the cell.  Cashman's  work culminated in the development of long wave infrared detectors used during the Second World War. Reliable Tl2S detectors were also developed in Germany at the same time.  Tl2S is found in nature as the mineral carlinite which has the distinction of being the only sulfide mineral of thallium that does not contain at least two metals. Tl2S has a distorted anti-CdI2 structure.
Tl2S can be prepared from the elements or by precipitating the sulfide from a solution of thallium(I), e.g. the  sulfate or nitrate. Thin films have been deposited, produced from a mixture of citratothallium complex and thiourea. Heating the film in nitrogen at 300°C converts all the product into Tl2S

References

Sulfides
Thallium(I) compounds